The 1966 Wisconsin gubernatorial election was held on November 8, 1966.   Republican Warren P. Knowles won the election with 54% of the vote, winning his second term as Governor of Wisconsin and defeating Democrat Patrick Lucey.

Results

References

Wisconsin
1966 Wisconsin elections
1966
November 1966 events in the United States